Alkalibacillus aidingensis is a Gram-negative, aerobic and motile bacterium from the genus Alkalibacillus which has been isolated from the Aiding Lake in the Xinjiang Province.

References

Bacillaceae
Bacteria described in 2021